Variety (also known by the alternative titles Jealousy or Vaudeville) is a 1925 German silent drama film directed by Ewald Andre Dupont based on the 1912 novel The Oath of Stephan Huller by Felix Hollaender.

The trapeze scenes are set in the Berlin Wintergarten theatre. The camera swings from long shot to close-up, like the acrobats.

The story was loosely remade by Dupont as the 1931 German sound film Salto Mortale.

Plot
In the film, Jannings portrays "Boss Huller", a former trapeze artist who was badly injured in a fall from the high wire and who now runs a seedy carnival with his wife (Maly Delschaft) and their child. Huller insists that the family take in a beautiful stranger (Lya De Putti) as a new sideshow dancer, with whom he develops a new trapeze number. He falls in love with the new star, and the story ends in tragedy.

Cast
 Emil Jannings as Boss Huller
 Maly Delschaft as wife of Boss
 Lya De Putti as Bertha
 Warwick Ward as Artinelli
 Georg John

Release
The film was heavily censored when it was released in the United States (except for New York) by excising the entire first reel, "thus destroying the motivation of the tragedy, implying that the acrobat was married to his Eurasian temptress."

Influence
The film is noted for its innovative camerawork with highly expressive movement through space, accomplished by the expressionist cinematographer Karl Freund.

Decades later, the German director Florian Henckel von Donnersmarck cites being unexpectedly exposed to the film as a child of four as the start of his interest in the medium.

This film is believed to contain the first documentation of unicycle hockey – it features a short sequence showing two people playing the game.

See also
The House That Shadows Built (1931 promotional film by Paramount which excerpts this film)

References

External links

Photographs and literature on Jealousy

1925 films
German black-and-white films
Circus films
1925 drama films
Films based on German novels
Films directed by E. A. Dupont
Films of the Weimar Republic
Films set in Berlin
German drama films
German silent feature films
Remakes of German films
Films produced by Erich Pommer
UFA GmbH films
Silent drama films
1920s German films
1920s German-language films